Konur Alp, Konuralp or Konuralp Bey (d. 1328) was one of the warriors of Osman I and Orhan. Konur Alp was among the early commanders who served in the establishment of the Ottoman State.

Biography
Since 1300, when Osman Ghazi started the struggle against the Byzantines, Konur Alp was also present along with his fellow soldiers such as Akça Koca, Samsa Çavuş, Aykut Alp, and Abdurrahman Gazi.

Since Orhan Gazi took over the military administration while his father was still alive, he sent Konur Alp to take over the region towards the Black Sea. Konur Alp conquered Akyazı, Mudurnu, Sakarya, and Melen Basin. According to Ashikpashazade, he took Aydos Castle with the help of Gazi Abdurrahman on the orders of Orhan. In 1321, Mudanya was captured on the Sea of Marmara, which was the port of Bursa. Orhan then sent a column under Konur Alp towards Western Black Sea coast, prior to taking Bursa. In 1323, the city of Prusias ad Hypium was conquered from the Byzantine Empire by Osman Gazi (r. c. 1299–1323/4). Osman Ghazi handed over the city's control to his commander Konur Alp. In 1326, he played vital role in the conquest of Bursa.

Konur died in 1328 and is believed to have been buried in Düzce. After Konur Alp's death, the places under his administration were combined and given to Murad I.

In fiction 
Konur Alp was portrayed in the Turkish TV series Kuruluş Osman by Turkish actor Eren verdum in season 1 .

See also
Turgut Alp
Köse Mihal

References

External links

14th-century Ottoman military personnel
1328 deaths
14th-century deaths
Ottoman people of the Byzantine–Ottoman wars